Reem Obeid (born 27 January 1996) is a Lebanese footballer who plays as a defender for Lebanese club EFP.

See also
 List of Lebanon women's international footballers

References

External links

 
 

1996 births
Living people
People from Bint Jbeil District
Lebanese women's footballers
Lebanese Women's Football League players
Lebanon women's international footballers
Women's association football defenders
Zouk Mosbeh SC footballers
Eleven Football Pro players